Francisville is a census-designated place (CDP) in Boone County, Kentucky, United States. Its population was 7,944 as of the 2010 census. Francisville shares ZIP code 41048 with the neighboring CDP of Hebron. It is the northernmost community in the state.

History
Francisville was founded in 1819, when 77 members of the Bullitsburg Baptist Church decided to establish a church closer to their homes. The Sand Run Baptist Church was built for a cost of $2100. A post office, general store, school, hotel, and tobacco warehouse soon developed around the church.

Culture

Media 

Francisville is served by one daily newspaper, The Kentucky Enquirer (an edition of The Cincinnati Enquirer), and by one weekly newspaper, The Boone County Recorder. Francisville is also served by twelve television stations and many radio stations as part of the Greater Cincinnati media market.

Geography

Francisville is located in northern Boone County, on the southwestern side of the Cincinnati Metropolitan Area. Interstate 275, the beltway around Cincinnati, forms the southern edge of the CDP, with the community of Hebron to the south of I-275. Francisville extends to the north as far as Kentucky Route 8 (River Road) in the Ohio River valley. Kentucky Route 237 (North Bend Road) is the main road through Francisville, extending from KY 8 south to I-275 and beyond into Hebron and Burlington.

Francisville and Hebron have been experiencing aggressive residential, commercial and business growth. In Francisville the growth is focused along Kentucky Route 237 throughout the southern and central parts of the CDP. The Francisville area is sometimes referred to as the North Bend for its location in the bend of the Ohio River that forms the northernmost geographic area in the state of Kentucky.

Along Kentucky Route 237, 12 subdivisions have recently been under construction, and 2,855 homes have been approved but not yet built. More than 1,100 homes have been built in those subdivisions, according to the Boone County Planning Commission. The developments include the neighborhoods (from south to north) of Cardinal Cove, Parlor Grove, Settlers Point, Treetops, Thornwilde, Wyndemere, Deer Creek, Rivershore Farms, Northpointe, Taylor Ridge and Conway Hills.

Beginning in autumn 2007, Kentucky Route 237 underwent a $19 million rerouting and improvement including widening the road to five lanes from Litton Lane south of Interstate 275 to Cardinal Way. The road is now three lanes from Cardinal Way to just north of North Pointe Elementary School. The improvement features two roundabouts (the second and third of their type in northern Kentucky). One is located at Cardinal Way, the other at the intersection of Graves Road and Old North Bend Road. The project also yielded bike lanes and an  pedestrian path. As part of the KY 237 realignment, a TANK Park and Ride facility is located on the west side of the roundabout with Cardinal Way.

Demographics

Transportation

Air 
Hebron is served by (and is home to) Cincinnati/Northern Kentucky International Airport  which is a hub for Delta Air Lines and DHL Aviation, along with focus city for Allegiant Air and Frontier Airlines.

Highways 

Hebron is served by one major interstate highway. Interstate 275 is an outer-belt highway through Northern Kentucky.

It is also served by numerous state highways: Kentucky Route 237 (North Bend Road), Kentucky Route 20 (Petersburg Road), and formerly Kentucky Route 3168 (Limaburg Road).

ARTIMIS is Greater Cincinnati's interstate information service. Current highway conditions are available 24/7 locally by dialing 511. For out-of-town drivers or "511"-disabled phone systems, one can call 513-333-3333.

In 2010, work on the KY 237 bridge over I-275 finished, with additional sidewalk and storm drain work.

Bus service 
Hebron is served by the Transit Authority of Northern Kentucky (TANK) which serves Northern Kentucky and operates bus links in Cincinnati at Metro's main Government Square hub.

Economy 
Francisville ("Hebron" often appears as the mailing address) is home to a number of organizations. This includes an Amazon.com Regional Fulfillment Center in World Park (4 of 15 nationwide).

Carl_Zeiss_AG ZEISS Vision Care U.S. United States Corporate Headquarters

Sports

Traditions Golf Club is located in Francisville on Williams Road. Founded in 1991, the club's 18-hole championship golf course has been ranked by Golf Digest as the third best course in the Kentucky and by Turf Magazine as the second best course.

References

Census-designated places in Boone County, Kentucky
Census-designated places in Kentucky